The Rayong Aquarium is a public aquarium in the town of Rayong, Rayong Province, Thailand. Owned and operated jointly by the Department of Fisheries of Thailand and the Eastern Marine Fisheries Research and Development Center, the aquarium hosts 43 aquarium tanks with the capacity of 1-4 tons each, an underwater glass tunnel, an outdoor shark and ray pond, a shell museum, and fishing boat exhibitions.

External links
  (In Thai)

Aquaria in Thailand
Buildings and structures in Rayong province
Tourist attractions in Rayong province